Michael Shayne Graham (born December 9, 1977) is an American football coach and former placekicker. Graham played 15 seasons in the National Football League (NFL). He played college football at Virginia Tech. He made his professional debut in May 2000 with the Richmond Speed of the Arena Football League's now-defunct developmental league, AF2.

His first NFL contract was with the New Orleans Saints where he signed as an undrafted free agent in 2000. A journeyman most of his career, he played for 14 different NFL franchises over 9 seasons, excluding the 7 seasons he spent with the Cincinnati Bengals. With the Bengals, he made the Pro Bowl in 2005. In the latter part of his career, he was signed as an injury replacement or to provide competition during training camps for a number of teams.

In 2018, Graham was hired as a special teams intern at Michigan State University.

Early years
Graham attended Pulaski County High School in Dublin, Virginia, graduating in 1996. He holds many of the school's kicking records including most field goals in career (28, from 1992 to 1995), most field goals in a season (15, 1995), and longest field goal, a 54-yarder against Anacostia in 1995.

College career
Graham played college football at Virginia Tech and was named to the first-team All-Big East Conference in all four seasons. In 1999, as a senior, Graham earned Big East Special Teams Player of the Year honors after leading the conference and breaking the school's single-season scoring record with 107 points on 56-of-57 extra points and 17-of-22 field goals. He was 68-of-93 (73.1%) in field goals for his Virginia Tech career and set a Virginia Tech and Big East record with 97 consecutive successful extra points. He left Virginia Tech as the all-time scoring leader in school history and Big East history with 371 points. His contributions at Tech led to his induction in the Virginia Tech Sports Hall of Fame.

Professional career

Richmond Speed
Following a tryout with the Cleveland Browns, it was announced in May 2000, that Graham would play in two games for the Richmond Speed of the AF2, and that he would use the time to practice for a future NFL tryout with the Tennessee Titans. As it turned out Graham played in only one game for the Speed, a 60 - 21 loss against the Arkansas Twisters on May 26, 2000. During the game, he missed two field goals, from 36 and 44-yards, and two of three extra points. After the game, Graham told the Roanoke Times: "It was a big adjustment. In the arena game, the holder puts the ball down, then the kicker starts forward. I've always been accustomed to starting with the snap. My rhythm was all messed up." Graham left the team and was replaced by special teams coach Dave DeArmas, who unretired and played in the following week's game against the Jacksonville Tomcats.

New Orleans Saints
After going undrafted in the 2000 NFL Draft, Graham signed with the New Orleans Saints on June 30, 2000. Graham was 1-for-1 on extra points and did not attempt a field goal during the preseason. He was waived on August 22, 2000.

Seattle Seahawks
Graham was signed by the Seattle Seahawks on April 27, 2001. He was 6-for-6 on extra points in the preseason but had his only field goal attempt blocked. He was waived on September 2, 2001. On October 30, 2001, Graham was invited back for a tryout after kicker Rian Lindell missed two field goals in a 24–20 loss to the Miami Dolphins. Graham did not get a contract and Lindell was retained as the Seahawks' kicker for the remainder of the 2001 season.

Buffalo Bills
The Buffalo Bills signed Graham on November 27, 2001, to replace rookie kicker Jake Arians; Arians had missed several key field goals and a crucial extra point over the course of the season. Graham played in the Bills' final six games, going 6-for-8 on field goals. He was released on April 23, 2002, and replaced by Mike Hollis.

Seattle Seahawks (second stint)
Graham was re-signed by the Seahawks on May 13, 2002. He began training camp with Seattle before being waived on August 13, 2002.

Carolina Panthers
Graham signed with the Carolina Panthers on September 28, 2002, after an injury to veteran John Kasay. Originally, Jon Hilbert replaced Kasay; however, after missing two field goals during the Week 3 game versus the Minnesota Vikings, Hilbert was replaced by Graham.  The following week, in a game against the Green Bay Packers and after being on the team for only two days, Graham missed a 24-yard field goal inches to the right with 13 seconds remaining that would have tied the score. The Panthers ended up losing the game 17–14. In total he played in 11 of the Panthers' final 13 games, leading the team in scoring with 60 points. He was 13-of-18 on field goals and averaged 66 yards on his five kickoffs.

After spending the 2003 preseason with Carolina, Graham was waived on August 31, right before the season began.

Cincinnati Bengals
The Cincinnati Bengals claimed Graham off waivers on September 1, 2003. With the Bengals in 2003, Graham played in all 16 games and set a franchise record by making 88% (22-of-25) of his field goals.

In the following offseason, Graham was tendered a restricted free agent offer sheet by the Jacksonville Jaguars, but the offer was matched by the Bengals. In 2004, Graham narrowly missed matching his previous season's accuracy mark, finishing the year 27-of-31 (87.1%) on field goals. In 2005, Graham made 28-of-32 field goals (87.5%), scored a franchise record 131 points, was selected to be the kicker for the AFC Pro Bowl squad, and helped the Bengals record their first winning season since 1990. Graham was the first kicker in franchise history ever to be selected to play in a Pro Bowl.

In 2005, Graham set the NFL record for tackles by a kicker with 11 combined (7 plus 4 assists.)

In 2006, Graham finished fourth in the AFC with 115 points and was 25-of-30 (83.3%) on field goals on the season.

In 2007, Graham missed his first field goal attempt of the season (a 53-yard attempt). But after that, he set a Bengals record by kicking 21 consecutive field goals without a miss over the season's first 10 games. This included a game against the Baltimore Ravens where he set a franchise record by kicking 7 field goals (the second highest total in NFL history). His streak came to an end when he missed a 26-yard attempt in Week 12.  By the end of the season, Graham set new franchise records for field goals in a season (31) and field goal percentage (91.2).

Graham finished the 2008 season with an 87.5 field goal percentage, going 21-of-24. In 2009, Graham went 23-of-28 in the regular season, his lowest percentage — 82.1 — in his Bengals career. In the Wild Card playoffs on January 9, 2010, Graham missed two field goals in the Bengals' 24–14 loss to the New York Jets, including a 28-yard attempt that would have cut the score to 24–17 late in the fourth quarter. After the game, Marvin Lewis commented on Graham's missed field goals stating "It is a shame, and it killed us. Unfortunately kicking is mostly a one-man operation. I know Shayne feels worse about it than anyone. Those points obviously make a big difference."

He was not re-signed as an unrestricted free agent following the 2009 season.

Baltimore Ravens
In June 2010, Graham signed a 1-year-deal with the Baltimore Ravens worth up to $2.5 million. Graham was released during final cuts before the season started in favor of Billy Cundiff.

New York Giants
On October 16, 2010, the New York Giants signed Graham due to an injury to kicker Lawrence Tynes. Graham only played in one game for the Giants and did not attempt a field goal. He did, however, make all four of his extra point attempts. On October 18, 2010, just two days after being signed, the Giants released Graham.

New England Patriots
On November 10, 2010, the New England Patriots signed Graham after an injury to kicker Stephen Gostkowski. In his first game, in Week 10 against the Pittsburgh Steelers, Graham was 2-for-2 on field goals but missed one of four extra point attempts on the night. In eight games, Graham finished the 2010 season 12-for-12 on field goals, and 35-for-37 on extra points.
In the playoffs, Graham was 2-for-2 in the Patriots loss to the Jets.

Washington Redskins
On August 1, 2011, the Washington Redskins signed Graham to provide training camp competition for Graham Gano. After missing two field goals in a pre-season game, Graham was released.

Dallas Cowboys
On August 23, 2011, the Dallas Cowboys signed Graham due to a hip injury to David Buehler, but did not make the roster after being passed on the depth chart by rookie Dan Bailey.

Miami Dolphins
The Miami Dolphins signed Graham on November 19, 2011, after an injury to Dan Carpenter. Graham was waived November 30.

Baltimore Ravens (second stint)
The Baltimore Ravens signed Graham on December 21, 2011, to back up Billy Cundiff, who had a calf injury throughout most of December. He made both field goal attempts and both extra point attempts in his short stint with the team. Graham was released on January 3.

Houston Texans
The Texans signed Graham on May 7, 2012, to battle rookie Randy Bullock for the position. In August, Graham was named the team's kicker after Bullock went on injured reserve. On January 13, 2013, Graham set his career longest field goal after he made a 55-yard field goal against the New England Patriots in the divisional round of the playoffs.

Cleveland Browns
On April 15, 2013, the Cleveland Browns signed Graham to replace Phil Dawson who left as a free agent. On August 31, 2013, he was surprisingly released, even after making all of his pre-season attempts, leaving the Browns with no kicker on the roster days before the season began.

Pittsburgh Steelers
On September 9, 2013, the Pittsburgh Steelers signed Graham due to a hamstring injury to Shaun Suisham. Graham was on the roster for one game, but was inactive due to Suisham's ability to play through his injury. Since he was not needed, Graham was released by the Steelers on September 17.

New Orleans Saints (second stint)
Graham was re-signed by the Saints on December 17, 2013, to replace Garrett Hartley.  Hartley had been cut from the Saints after he had struggled in the 2012 and 2013 seasons and the final straw came when he missed two close range field goals in a game against the St. Louis Rams. On January 4, 2014, Graham went 4 for 4 including a 32-yard game winner as time expired to propel the Saints past the Philadelphia Eagles in the Wild Card round of the 2014 playoffs. However, the following week during the Divisional Round game he missed two field goals versus the Seattle Seahawks. On his first miss, from 45-yards, holder (and backup quarterback) Luke McCown had the laces facing the wrong way. Strong winds also contributed to his poor performance.

On February 14, 2014, the Saints re-signed Graham to a new one-year contract with a base salary of $955,000. In a surprise move, Graham along with kicker Derek Dimke were released as part of the final roster cuts on August 30, 2014, leaving the Saints with no kickers on their roster after the reduction to 53-players. A few days later on September 2, 2014, it was announced that the Saints had waived quarterback Ryan Griffin to make room for the re-signing of Graham to their 53-man roster.

Graham was selected as NFC special teams player of the month for October 2014, for making all nine field goals and all nine extra points he tried during the month. He also scored 14 points during the October 26, 2014 victory over the Packers.

After Graham missed a 42-yard field goal during the Saints' loss to the Carolina Panthers on  December 7, 2014, the Saints tried out kickers Garrett Hartley, Derek Dimke and Zach Hocker on December 10, 2014. However, in the end the Saints decided to stick with Graham as their kicker.

On February 12, 2015, Graham was re-signed to a one-year deal with the Saints. He was released on May 19, 2015.

Atlanta Falcons
On November 26, 2015, Graham signed with the Atlanta Falcons as a replacement kicker, after Matt Bryant injured his leg. On August 20, 2016, Graham was re-signed by the Falcons. On September 3, 2016, Graham was released by the Falcons.

Retirement
On February 6, 2017, Graham announced his retirement from the NFL at the age of 39 to pursue jobs as a special teams coach. Graham signed an unofficial ceremonial contract on February 21, 2017, to retire as a Bengal.

Coaching career

Central Michigan 
In March 2017, Graham was hired as a special teams coach at Central Michigan University

Michigan State 
In June 2018, Graham was hired at Michigan State University as a special teams intern.

Florida 
Graham was hired at the University of Florida in 2020 as a special teams quality control coach.

NFL career statistics

Bengals franchise records
 Most field goals in a season (31)
 Most field goals in a game (7)
 Highest field goal percentage in a season (91.2)
 Highest field goal percentage in a career (86.8)

References

External links
Atlanta Falcons bio
Cincinnati Bengals bio
Houston Texans bio
New Orleans Saints bio

1977 births
Living people
People from Blacksburg, Virginia
People from Dublin, Virginia
Players of American football from Virginia
American football placekickers
Virginia Tech Hokies football players
American Conference Pro Bowl players
Richmond Speed players
New Orleans Saints players
Seattle Seahawks players
Buffalo Bills players
Carolina Panthers players
Cincinnati Bengals players
Baltimore Ravens players
New York Giants players
New England Patriots players
Washington Redskins players
Dallas Cowboys players
Miami Dolphins players
Houston Texans players
Cleveland Browns players
Pittsburgh Steelers players
Atlanta Falcons players
People from Radford, Virginia
Michigan State Spartans football coaches